Playing the ball and putting the ball in play are the names of two of the rules of bandy, rule 7 and rule 10 of the Bandy Playing Rules. They are similar and thus are both dealt with in this text.

According to rule 7.1, a bandy player is allowed to hit, stop, give direction to or bring the ball with him as long as the point where his stick hits the ball is not higher than his shoulder when it is in an upright position. Even if the stick should be used, the player may direct the ball with his body or with his skates, according to rule 7.2, but not with his hand, arm or head, and if he continues playing the ball, he should use his stick and nothing else. Breaking the rules may give the other team a free stroke or a penalty stroke, according to rule 7.3.

Under rule 10 of the bandy playing rules, the two basic states of play during a game are ball in play and ball out of play. From the beginning of each playing period with a stroke-off (a set strike from the centre-spot by one team) until the end of the playing period, the ball is in play at all times, except when either the ball leaves the field of play, or play is stopped by the referee. When the ball becomes out of play, play is restarted by one of six restart methods depending on how it went out of play:

If the time runs out while a team is preparing for a free-stroke or penalty, the strike should still be made but it must go into the goal by one shot to count as a goal. Similarly, a goal made via a corner stroke should be allowed, but it must be executed using only one shot in addition to the strike needed to put the ball in play.

References

Bandy rules
Bandy terminology